"You're Gonna Miss Me When I'm Gone" is a song co-written and recorded by American country music duo Brooks & Dunn.  It was released in June 1995 as the fourth single from their third album Waitin' on Sundown.  The song reached the top of the Billboard Hot Country Singles & Tracks chart. This is the third single to feature Kix Brooks on lead vocals instead of Ronnie Dunn, and the only single of such that was one of Brooks & Dunn's 20 Billboard No. 1 hits. The song was written by the duo along with Don Cook.

In 2019, Brooks & Dunn re-recorded "You're Gonna Miss Me When I'm Gone" with American country music artist Ashley McBryde for their album Reboot.

Content
The male narrator explains to his significant other that she has constantly been mistreating him, and although he still shows great affection for her, he ultimately comes to the realization that their relationship is in serious jeopardy because of her actions and therefore contemplates ending the relationship for good. Beforehand, the narrator presents his soon-to-be former lover an opportunity to give him a farewell kiss, informing her that she will regret the mistakes that she had made and will miss him after he leaves her.

Cover versions
Country music singer Kenny Chesney covered the song from The Last Rodeo Tour

Critical reception
Billboard'''s Eric Boehler praised the craftsmanship and production of the song, simply calling it "another welcome Brooks & Dunn outing." Deborah Evans Price, also of Billboard, reviewed the song favorably, calling it a welcome change of pace from their "typically terrific barn-burning honky-tonkers and affecting tear-in-the-beer ballads." She goes on to call it "excellent song craftsmanship with great production."

Chart history
"You're Gonna Miss Me When I'm Gone" debuted at number 72 on the U.S. Billboard'' Hot Country Singles & Tracks for the week of June 10, 1995.

Year-end charts

References

1995 singles
Brooks & Dunn songs
Ashley McBryde songs
Songs written by Kix Brooks
Songs written by Don Cook
Songs written by Ronnie Dunn
Song recordings produced by Scott Hendricks
Song recordings produced by Don Cook
Arista Nashville singles
1994 songs